The 2021–22 season was FC Shakhtar Donetsk's 31st season in existence and the club's 23rd consecutive season in the top flight of Ukrainian football. In addition to the domestic league, Shakhtar Donetsk participated in this season's editions of the Ukrainian Cup, the Ukrainian Super Cup and the UEFA Champions League. The season covered the period from 24 July 2021 to 30 June 2022.

Season events
On 12 May, Luís Castro and his coaching staff left Shakhtar Donetsk. On 25 May, Roberto De Zerbi  is going to be Shakhtar head coach for the next two seasons.

For the season in a row, Shakhtar Donetsk will play their home games for at the NSC Olimpiyskiy in Kyiv.

On 20 July, Shakhtar Donetsk announced the signing of Vinicius Tobias from Internacional, with the defender joining Shakhtar Donetsk in February 2021 once he turns 18.

On 26 July, Marquinhos Cipriano joined Sion on a season-long loan deal.

On 8 November, Shakhtar Donetsk announced that Dentinho was leaving the club after 10 years.

On 8 December, Júnior Moraes extended his contract with Shakhtar Donetsk until 30 June 2022. The following day, 9 December, Alan Patrick and Maycon both extended their contracts with Shakhtar Donetsk until 31 December 2025.

On 12 December, Shakhtar Donetsk announced that Marlos would leave the club when his contract expired at the end of the year.

On 15 January, Shakhtar Donetsk announced the signing of David Neres from AFC Ajax, on a contract until 31 December 2026. Also on 15 January, Shakhtar Donetsk confirmed the signing of Vinicius Tobias from Internacional.

On 30 January, Danylo Ihnatenko joined Girondins de Bordeaux on loan for the remainder of the season. The following day, 31 January, Danylo Sikan joined Hansa Rostock on loan for the remainder of the season.

On 12 February, Shakhtar Donetsk announced that Yevhen Konoplyanka had been released by the club. The following day, Shakhtar Donetsk extended their contracts with Mykhailo Mudryk and Heorhiy Sudakov until 31 December 2026.

On 24 February, the Ukrainian Premier League was suspended due to the imposition of Martial law in Ukraine due to the 2021–2022 Russo-Ukrainian crisis.

On 16 March, Júnior Moraes joined Corinthians on a permanent deal until December 2023.

On 29 March, Azerbaijan Premier League club Sabah announced the signing of Oleksiy Kashchuk on loan until the end of the season.

On 31 March, Shakhtar Donetsk confirmed that Maycon had joined Corinthians on loan until the end of 2022. On the same day, Olympique Lyonnais announced the signing of Tetê on a contract until 30 June 2022, Tetê's contract currently being suspended with Shakhtar Donetsk.

On 1 April, Vinicius Tobias joined Real Madrid on loan until the end of the 2022–23 season, with an option to make the move permanent.

On 3 April, Shakhtar announced that they would play friendly matches in Turkey against Beşiktaş, Fenerbahçe, Sevilla, Hajduk Split, Paris Saint-Germain and Lazio to help raise funds for Ukraine.

On 7 April, Internacional announced the signing of Vitão on a contract until 30 June 2022, under the same rules that saw Tetê joining Olympique Lyonnais.

On 12 April, Shakhtar announced that former captain, Yaroslav Rakitskyi, had returned to the club to train and play for the club during their Global Tour for Peace matches. The following day, Alan Patrick left the club to sign permanently for Internacional.

On 26 April, the Premier League season was terminated due to the 2022 Russian invasion of Ukraine, with the standings reflecting the positions of each team heading into the winter break, meaning Shakhtar Donetsk finished in first position.

Squad

Contract suspensions

On loan

Transfers

In

 Tobias' move was announced on the above date, and activated on 15 January 2022.

Out

Loans out

Contract suspensions

Released

Friendlies

Competitions

Overall record
{{Fb overview2
|c=3
|c1=Premier League |fm1=24 July 2021      |lm1=11 December 2021              |sr1=Matchday 1              |fp1=1st (no title awarded)          |w1=15|d1=2 |l1=1 |f1=49|a1=10 
|c2=Ukrainian Cup             |dm2=27 October 2021              |sr2=Round of 16             |fp2=Quarter-finals (cancelled)          
|w2=1 |d2=0 |l2=0 |f2=3 |a2=0
|c3=Super Cup              |dm3=22 September 2021 |sr3=Final                                        |fp3=Winners
|w3=1 |d3=0 |l3=0 |f3=3 |a3=0
|c4=Champions League  |fm4=3 August 2021     |lm4=7 December 2021 |sr4=Third qualifying round  |fp4=Group stage 
|w4=3 |d4=3 |l4=4 |f4=9 |a4=16
|s=Results
}}

Premier League

League table

Results summary

Results by round

Results

Ukrainian Cup

Ukrainian Super Cup

UEFA Champions League

Third qualifying round

Play-off round

Group stage

Squad statistics

Appearances and goals

|-
|colspan="14"|Players who suspended their contracts:|-
|colspan="16"|Players away on loan:|-
|colspan="16"|Players who left Shakhtar Donetsk during the season:''

|}

Goalscorers

Clean sheets

Disciplinary record

References

External links 
Official website

Shakhtar Donetsk
FC Shakhtar Donetsk seasons
Shakhtar Donetsk